Maričić is a Serbian and a Croatian surname. It may refer to:

Damir Maričić (born 1959), Croatian footballer
Goran Maričić (born 1988), Serbian footballer
Ines Maričić (born 1988), Croatian 9 pin bowling player
Veljko Maričić (1907–1973), Croatian actor

Serbian surnames
Croatian surnames